Automeris belti is a moth of the family Saturniidae first described by Herbert Druce in 1886. It is found from Mexico to Colombia and Ecuador.

The wingspan is 95–100 mm.

Subspecies
Automeris belti belti (Mexico, Nicaragua, Panama)
Automeris belti zaruma Schaus, 1921 (Ecuador)

References

Moths described in 1886
Hemileucinae
Moths of North America
Moths of South America